The Arne is a former river, possibly originally a tidal creek, in the Netherlands on which the city of Middelburg was founded. The Arne gave the city access to the Sloe, a confluent of the Westerschelde. Between 1266 and 1301, the Arne was dammed in Middelburg and later the river silted up. Therefore, in 1532 digging commenced on the ca. 3 km long Havenkanaal (Harbour Channel) (opened on the 24th of August 1535), causing Middelburg to again have a navigable connection to the Sloe and the Westerschelde.

Arnemuiden, which lays on the original estuary of the Arne, gets its name from this river.

References

External links
Arne, Encyclopedie van Zeeland (in Dutch)

Rivers of Zeeland